Bottom Live 2001: An Arse Oddity was the fourth live show based on the British sitcom Bottom. It was recorded at Nottingham Royal Concert Hall.

Plot
The first act involves Eddie and Richie on a similar tropical island to the one from Bottom Live 3: Hooligan's Island. Eddie has been away in the jungle gambling for three days, and Richie is wearing some tight 'pants' that he cannot get off. Eddie returns and helps him to get them off, when Richie's parrot Dave has a heart attack. At first, they try the kiss of life, but Richie becomes too enthusiastic and gets his tongue caught in the parrot's mouth. Next, they try a defibrillator, but increasing it to maximum voltage to try and resuscitate Dave causes him to explode. The pair put his remains in a box and place it in a grave (that Eddie had dug for Richie with a gravestone saying 'THE FAT TWAT IS DEAD. HOORAY, PISS HERE') and Eddie takes pictures of the scene. Once this is finished, they have a few drinks at Eddie's makeshift bar and become increasingly bored, so decide on the spot to have a fighting match. Eddie wins again, and Richie prays to God begging him to relieve him of the boredom by killing him. He receives a sharp pain in his chest and believes it is a heart attack but Eddie reveals to him that he simply put his underpants on instead of his vest. He manages to convince Richie to keep away from him in exchange for milking the pig (who he nicknames Vanessa Feltz), but it doesn't go so well and he only gets enough milk for a cup of tea each, because the pig in fact was not female like both had thought, meaning the "milk" was actually semen. The pair then realise it is the interval, and race off to the bar before the audience get there.

The second act changes the structure drastically, with the pair (now in their traditional costumes) falling down chutes into a capsule-like room. After another fight (which Eddie wins once again), the pair try and remember how they got there in the first place, but struggle to recall anything. Richie says a good way out would be to climb up the chutes they came down in. Eddie tries this, but ends up in the same room, with Richie believing he's gone somewhere else. Eddie then kicks Richie up the rear end, and Richie turns round to find him there. Next, Richie tries this, leaving Eddie to have a conversation with an imaginary person, and comes back to find Eddie again, bringing him to the theory that he is on an alien ant farm with multiple clones of Eddie. They discuss their situation, and acknowledge that the audience are missing the second part of the play, and make fun out of the actors play them in real life. While Eddie tries again, Richie prays to God, but soon insults him as the situation is not dramatic enough and the spotlight is shining in the wrong area. Eddie then returns with two pints, saying he found a bar (which is really just the theatre bar they went to in the interval) which helps them realise they are still in Nottingham, and attempt to find a 'bird' in the audience. Eddie goes to the toilet on the electrics inside the chute, and when the lights come back on, he is seen walking away with a briefcase overstuffed with cash. He reveals he stole it from the theatre manager and Richie sees it as perfect for their future. They then put on underwear and close the show by singing a song about pants.

Trivia
Richie says "That tosser who fell off the quad bike." This is a reference to a true event where Rik Mayall fell off a quad bike and nearly died.

This is their first live show where their characters do not die at the end.

This is the first live show not to be numbered in sequence.

This is the only Bottom Live show which was not released on audio format.

During the second act of the show Richie mentions Spudgun, one of Eddie's friends (and while still calling him Spudgun mentions how he's 'moved up' referencing the actor doing other work after Bottom). Spudgun, along with Eddie's other friend Dave Hedgehog and Lamb and Flag pub owner Dick Head haven't been seen since the third series episode "Dough", and this marks the first time since the television series ended that Eddie or Richie have mentioned either one of them.

See also
Bottom (TV series)
Bottom Live: The Big Number Two Tour

References 

Bottom (TV series)